The executive magistrates of the Roman Kingdom were elected officials of the ancient Roman Kingdom. During the period of the Roman Kingdom, the Roman King was the principal executive magistrate. His power, in practice, was absolute. He was the chief executive, chief priest, chief lawgiver, chief judge, and the sole commander-in-chief of the army. He had the sole power to select his own assistants, and to grant them their powers. Unlike most other ancient monarchs, his powers rested on law and legal precedent, through a type of statutory authorization known as "Imperium" (Latin: "Command"). He could only receive these powers through the political process of a democratic election, and could theoretically be removed from office.  As such, he could not pass his powers to an heir upon his death, and he typically received no divine honors or recognitions. When the king died, his power reverted to the Roman Senate, which then chose an Interrex to facilitate the election of a new king. The new king was then formally elected by the People of Rome, and, upon the acquiescence of the Roman Senate, he was granted his Imperium by the people through the popular assembly.

The King of Rome

According to the contemporary historian Sallust, the grade of legal authority (imperium) possessed by the Roman King was known as imperium legitimum. This probably meant that the only restriction on the king was that he observe precedent (mos maiorum). This would, for example, suggest (but not require) that he consult with the senate before making decisions. In practice, therefore, the king had no real restrictions on his power. When war broke out, he had the sole power to organize and levy troops, to select leaders for the army, and to conduct the campaign as he saw fit. He controlled all property held by the state, had the sole power to divide land and war spoils, was the chief representative of the city during dealings with either the Gods or leaders of other communities, and could unilaterally decree any new law. Sometimes he submitted his decrees to either the popular assembly or to the senate for a ceremonial ratification, but a rejection did not prevent the enactment of a decree. 

The king sometimes abided by the one restriction on his power (that he observe precedent). Sometimes, he abided by this restriction out of practical necessity, and at other times, he abided simply to respect tradition. While the king could unilaterally declare war, for example, he typically wanted to have such declarations ratified by the popular assembly. In addition, he did not usually decide matters that dealt with family law, but instead let the popular assembly decide these matters. While the king had absolute power over criminal and civil trials, he probably only presided over a case in its early stages (in iure), and then referred the case to one of his assistants (an iudex) for settlement. In the most serious criminal cases, the king may have referred the case to the people, assembled in the popular assembly, for trial. In addition, the king usually received consent from the other priests before introducing new deities.

The period between the death of a king, and the election of a new king, was known as the interregnum. During the interregnum, the senate elected a senator to the office of Interrex to facilitate the election of a new king. Once the Interrex found a suitable nominee for the kingship, he presented this nominee to the Senate for an initial approval. If the Senate voted in favor of the nominee, that person stood for formal election before the People of Rome in the Curiate Assembly (the popular assembly). After the nominee was elected by the popular assembly, the senate ratified the election by passing a decree (the auctoritas patrum or "authority of the fathers"). Since any nominee was picked by a member of the senate (the Interrex), the auctoritas patrum primarily functioned as a safeguard against a headstrong Interrex. The Interrex then formally declared the nominee to be king. The new king then took the auspices (a ritual search for omens from the Gods), and was vested with legal authority (imperium) by the popular assembly (through the passage of a law known as the lex curiata de imperio). In theory, the king was elected by the people, but in practice, it was the senate that had the real power over the election of new kings. The popular assembly could not select a candidate for the kingship. And while they could vote against a candidate, it was unlikely that they ever would.

Other executive officials

The king chose several officers to assist him, and unilaterally granted them their powers. When the king left the city, an Urban Prefect (praefectus urbi) presided over the city in place of the absent king. The king also had two Quaestors (quaestores parricidii) as general assistants, while several other officers (the duumviri perduellionis) assisted the king during treason cases. In war, the king occasionally commanded only the infantry, and delegated command over the cavalry to the commander of his personal bodyguards, the Tribune of the Celeres (tribunus celerum). In the early republic, this arrangement was revived with the creation of the offices of Dictator (the magister populi or "master of the infantry"), and that of the Dictator's subordinate, the Master of the Horse (the magister equitum or "master of the cavalry").

When the king (Latin: rex) died, his powers reverted to the senate. The period that began upon the death of a king, and end upon the election of a new king, was called the interregnum. When an interregnum began, an Interrex (literally "interim king") was chosen.  An Interrex always had to be a patrician. The exact method by which the first Interrex was chosen during a given interregnum is not known. What is known, however, is that each Interrex had to vacate his office after five days. Before he vacated his office, he had to choose a successor. A new Interrex was chosen every five days, until a new king had been sworn in. The Interrex was quite literally an "interim king". The only difference between the king and the Interrex was the five-day term limit that the Interrex was subject to. The Interrex had the same level of legal authority (imperium) as did the king. Therefore, while the Interrex was required to facilitate the election of a new king, the powers of the Interrex were not limited to this function. The Interrex could, for example, issue any decree, make any law, command the army, and preside over the Senate and the assemblies.

See also 

 Roman Kingdom
 Roman Republic
 Roman Empire
 Roman Law
 Plebeian Council
 Centuria
 Curia
 Roman consul
 Praetor
 Roman censor
 Quaestor
 Aedile
 Roman Dictator
 Master of the Horse
 Roman Senate
 Cursus honorum
 Byzantine Senate
 Pontifex Maximus
 Princeps senatus
 Interrex
 Promagistrate
 Acta Senatus

Notes

References 

 Abbott, Frank Frost (1901). A History and Description of Roman Political Institutions. Elibron Classics.
 Byrd, Robert (1995). The Senate of the Roman Republic. U.S. Government Printing Office, Senate Document 103-23.
 Cicero, Marcus Tullius (1841). The Political Works of Marcus Tullius Cicero: Comprising his Treatise on the Commonwealth; and his Treatise on the Laws. Translated from the original, with Dissertations and Notes in Two Volumes. By Francis Barham, Esq. London: Edmund Spettigue. Vol. 1.
 Lintott, Andrew (1999). The Constitution of the Roman Republic. Oxford University Press.
 Polybius (1823). The General History of Polybius: Translated from the Greek. By James Hampton. Oxford: Printed by W. Baxter. Fifth Edition, Vol 2.
 Taylor, Lily Ross (1966). Roman Voting Assemblies: From the Hannibalic War to the Dictatorship of Caesar. The University of Michigan Press.
 Considerations on the Causes of the Greatness of the Romans and their Decline, by Montesquieu
 The Roman Constitution to the Time of Cicero

Primary sources 
 Cicero's De Re Publica, Book Two
 Rome at the End of the Punic Wars: An Analysis of the Roman Government; by Polybius

Further reading

 Ihne, Wilhelm. Researches Into the History of the Roman Constitution. William Pickering. 1853. 
 Johnston, Harold Whetstone. Orations and Letters of Cicero: With Historical Introduction, An Outline of the Roman Constitution, Notes, Vocabulary and Index. Scott, Foresman and Company. 1891.
 Mommsen, Theodor. Roman Constitutional Law. 1871-1888
 Tighe, Ambrose. The Development of the Roman Constitution. D. Apple & Co. 1886.
 Von Fritz, Kurt. The Theory of the Mixed Constitution in Antiquity. Columbia University Press, New York. 1975.
 The Histories by Polybius
 Cambridge Ancient History, Volumes 9–13.
 A. Cameron, The Later Roman Empire, (Fontana Press, 1993).
 M. Crawford, The Roman Republic, (Fontana Press, 1978).
 E. S. Gruen, "The Last Generation of the Roman Republic" (U California Press, 1974)
 F. Millar, The Emperor in the Roman World, (Duckworth, 1977, 1992).
 A. Lintott, "The Constitution of the Roman Republic" (Oxford University Press, 1999)

 
Government of the Kingdom of Rome